Royal Quest II was a professional wrestling event promoted by New Japan Pro-Wrestling (NJPW). The event took place on October 1 & 2, 2022 at the Crystal Palace Indoor Arena in London, England.

Production

Background
Royal Quest II was the second event in the Royal Quest chronology, following the first event in 2019.

On July 29, NJPW and Stardom announced the creation of the IWGP Women's Championship, which would be defend at NJPW events in Japan and United States. The inaugural champion will be crowned at Historic X-Over. During a press confronance held on August 23, it was announced that one of the first-round matches of a tournament to determine the inaugural champion will be held at Royal Quest and would feature international female wrestlers. On August 27, during Stardom's 5 Star Grand Prix, it was announced that Alpha Female and Ava White would be participants in the international side of the tournament and will face off in the first round match at Royal Quest II.

Storylines
Royal Quest II featured professional wrestling matches that involved different wrestlers from pre-existing scripted feuds and storylines. Wrestlers portrayed villains, heroes or less distinguishable characters in the scripted events that built tension and culminate in a wrestling match or series of matches.

On June 26 at AEW x NJPW: Forbidden Door, ROH Tag Team Champions FTR (Cash Wheeler and Dax Harwood) defeated IWGP Tag Team Champions United Empire (Great-O-Khan and Jeff Cobb) in a winner Takes All three-way tag team match with also involved Roppongi Vice (Rocky Romero and Trent Beretta). On July 30, Aussie Open (Mark Davis and Kyle Fletcher) along with their United Empire stalemate TJP defeated FTR and Alex Zayne in a six-man tag team match at Music City Mayhem, after the match Aussie Open challenged FTR for the IWGP Tag Team titles which the title match was later made official for Royal Quest II on October 1.

Results

See also
2022 in professional wrestling
List of NJPW major events

References

External links
 

2022 in professional wrestling
October 2022 events in the United Kingdom
2022 in London
New Japan Pro-Wrestling shows
Professional wrestling in England
Events in London